Aristotelia ochroxysta is a moth of the family Gelechiidae. It was described by Edward Meyrick in 1929. It is found in North America, where it has been recorded from Texas.

The wingspan is about 10 mm. The forewings are blackish grey with a rather broad pale brownish-ochreous dorsal stripe from the base to the tornus, extended by some narrow suffusion on the termen to the apex, the edge slightly indented before the middle, broadest beyond this, where it extends nearly half across the wing. There is a whitish dot on the costa at four-fifths and some brownish scales in the disc posteriorly. The hindwings are grey.

References

Moths described in 1929
Aristotelia (moth)
Moths of North America